This is a list of places in Guatemala.

List of most populous cities in Guatemala 
Population data up to number 30 is based on the 2018 census.

Ancient cities and important ruins 
 Cancuén
 Dos Pilas
 El Baul
 Iximche
 Kaminaljuyu
 Machaquila
 El Mirador
 La Joyanca
 Mixco Viejo
 Naranjo 
 Nakbé
 Piedras Negras
 Quirigua
 Q'umarkaj
 Tikal

Natural features 
 Caribbean Sea
 Pacific Ocean
 Volcán de Agua
 Volcán de Fuego

Lakes

See also 
 List of national parks of Guatemala
 Lists of cities in Central America

References

External links

 
Guatemala
Cities
Guatemala